Hedmark University of Applied Sciences was a state university college in Hedmark, Norway, established in 1994. It had four campuses, located in Hamar, Elverum, Åmot (Rena) and Stor-Elvdal. The college had approximately 5,250 students and 450 employees. It was merged with Lillehammer University College to become the Inland Norway University of Applied Sciences in 2017.

The university was divided into four faculties: the Faculty of Health and Sports, the Faculty of Education and Natural Sciences Design, the Faculty of Forestry and Wildlife Management, and the Faculty of Business Administration, Social Sciences and Computer Science.

References

 
Inland Norway University of Applied Sciences
Defunct universities and colleges in Norway
Education in Innlandet
Educational institutions established in 1994
Education in Hamar
Åmot
Organisations based in Hamar
1994 establishments in Norway